The hydra effect or hydra paradox owes its name to the Greek legend of the Lernaean Hydra which grew two heads for each one cut off, and is used  figuratively for counter-intuitive effects of actions to reduce a problem which result in  stimulating its  multiplication. Most notably, scientists have proposed that ecological systems can exhibit a hydra effect when "a higher death rate in a particular species ultimately increases the size of its population". The hypothesis is suggested to have implications for the eradication of pests, and resource management. There are also said to be indications that reducing the death rate can shrink a population.

The hydra effect has also been used about negative outcomes when shutting down torrent sites which come back in more incarnations, and is cited by those opposing the war on drugs, COVID-19 lockdowns, and  targeted killing as counter-productive effects. In 2016 the site Torrentz shut down its operations without further information for the cause of the shut-down. However, within two weeks, there were 3 torrent sites that were built as replacements for Torrentz, which stands as a perfect example of the hydra effect. Similarly, after the torrent website The Pirate Bay was shut down in December 2014, it reincarnated with hundreds of copies within a week.

See also 
 Braess's paradox
 Paradox of enrichment
 Streisand effect
 Cobra effect

References

BitTorrent
Internet culture